Soyga is the name of several rural localities in Arkhangelsk Oblast, Russia:

Soyga, Lensky District, Arkhangelsk Oblast, a settlement in Soyginsky Selsoviet of Lensky District
Soyga, Verkhnetoyemsky District, Arkhangelsk Oblast, a settlement in Soyginsky Selsoviet of Verkhnetoyemsky District